Bagchaur is an urban municipality located in Salyan district of Karnali Province of Nepal.

The municipality is divided into total 12 wards.

The municipality was established on 19 September 2015 merging Tharmare, Sibaratha, Kotbara, Kotmala and Pipal Neta  On 10 March 2017 Government of Nepal announced 744 local level units as per the new constitution of Nepal 2015, thus Baphukhola VDC was Incorporated with municipality.

Demographics
At the time of the 2011 Nepal census, 100.0% of the population in Bagchaur Municipality spoke Nepali as their first language.

In terms of ethnicity/caste, 71.5% were Chhetri, 11.0% Kami, 5.3% Magar, 3.5% Thakuri, 3.1% Hill Brahmin, 2.8% Damai/Dholi, 1.4% Sanyasi/Dasnami, 1.0% Sarki, 0.3% Badi and 0.1% others.

In terms of religion, 99.4% were Hindu, 0.5% Christian and 0.1% Buddhist.

References

External links
bagchaurmun.gov.np

Populated places in Salyan District (Azerbaijan)
Municipalities in Karnali Province
Nepal municipalities established in 2015